Pigs is the second album by Asphalt Ballet, released on Virgin Records in 1993. Tommy Dean joined on vocals. It was the band's final album.

Asphalt Ballet supported the album with a North American tour that included shows with Great White.

Critical reception

The San Diego Union-Tribune stated that Asphalt Ballet "roars through the heavy-metal catalog with maximum speed and skill, minimum fuss and a welcome lack of pretense."

AllMusic wrote that the band "made a play at musical relevance via aggro alt-rock, rather than the bluesy hard rock the group displayed a minor flair for on their 1991 debut."

Track listing

Personnel
Tommy Dean - Vocals
Terry Phillips - Bass
Julius Ulrich - Guitar
Danny Clarke - Guitar
Mikki Kiner - Drums

References

Asphalt Ballet albums
1993 albums
Virgin Records albums